Frank Mandeville Rogers V (born in Florence, South Carolina, United States) is an American record producer, songwriter, music publisher  and session musician. In 1990, Rogers moved to Nashville, attending Belmont University and graduating with a Music Business degree. While at Belmont, he met friend and future collaborator Brad Paisley. After graduation, Rogers went to work for EMI Nashville Productions and opened up Sea Gayle Music Publishing with Paisley and Chris DuBois. The successful publishing company, has over 300 cuts and 28 number one songs. The three business partners, in late 2009, also teamed up with Sony Nashville to form Sea Gayle Records, with a roster that includes Jerrod Niemann.

In 2016, Rogers founded Fluid Music Revolution, a venture with Spirit Music Group. Current writers include Justin Adams, Erik Belz, Ryan Creamer, Monty Criswell, Mike Fiorentino, Derek George, Palmer Lee, and Jason Lehning.

In 2018, Rogers was named CEO of Spirit Music Nashville.

Rogers has produced music for several country music performers since 1999, including Trace Adkins, Brad Paisley, Josh Turner, Hootie & the Blowfish lead singer Darius Rucker, Phil Vassar and Darryl Worley. His work has resulted in thirteen Country Music Association award nominations, with one win (for Album of the Year — Paisley's Time Well Wasted in 2006). Rogers has also received five Academy of Country Music awards (ACM), as well as Billboard magazine's #1 Hot Country Producer Award from 2006–2010 and Music Row magazine's Producer of the Year award in 2005, 2007, 2008 and 2009.

Frank’s songwriting credits include Number One songs: "I'm Gonna Miss Her (The Fishin' Song)" by Brad Paisley, "Five More Minutes" & "This Is It" (co-written by Aaron Eshuis) by Scotty McCreery", Backroad Song" by Granger Smith, "Alright" and "This" by Darius Rucker. Other singles that Rogers co-wrote include Paisley's "Who Needs Pictures" and "Me Neither," Rucker's "History in the Making," Trace Adkins' "Don't Lie" and "Swing," Steve Holy's "Don't Make Me Beg," "He Will, She Knows" by Kenny Rogers, "Blow" by Ed Sheeran, Chris Stapleton and Bruno Mars.

Songwriting credits
The following is a list with selected songs written by Frank Rogers and recorded by other artists.

#1 singles produced
The following is a list of #1 songs produced by Frank Rogers.

References

External links
 Frank Rogers at EMI Music Publishing page
 Frank Rogers at Spirit Music Group page

Year of birth missing (living people)
Living people
American music publishers (people)
American country banjoists
American country songwriters
Record producers from South Carolina
People from Florence, South Carolina
Country musicians from South Carolina